Queen Sunwon (순원왕후; 8 June 1789 – 21 September 1857), of the Andong Kim clan was the queen consort and wife of Sunjo of Joseon. She was known as Queen Dowager Myeonggyeong (명경왕대비) after her husband's death in 1834. She served as regent between 1834 and 1841 during her grandson, Heonjong of Joseon's reign, and in 1849–1852 during her adoptive son, Cheoljong of Joseon's reign. She was posthumously called as Sunwon, the Respectful Empress (순원숙황후, 純元肅皇后).

Biography

Early life 
The future Queen Consort was born into the Andong Kim clan on 8 June 1789. She was the first daughter and third child of Kim Jo-sun and his wife, Lady Sim of the Cheongsong Sim clan. Through her mother, Lady Kim is a maternal descendant of Sim Ui-gyeom, Queen Insun’s younger brother, and Sim On, Queen Soheon’s father. 

As her mother’s side was connected to the royal family since her maternal grandfather, Sim Geon-ji, was a 5th cousin of Sim Neung-geon (심능건, 沈能建; 1752 – 7 July 1817); who was the son-in-law of Yeongjo of Joseon as he was married to his daughter, Princess Hwaryeong. Sim Geon-ji was also close to Sim Hwan-ji (심환지, 沈煥之; 1730 – 18 October 1802); who was a member of the Noron Byeokpa faction. Because of this, Sim Hwan-ji was able to interfere with the final selection of who could become Queen Consort.

As Lady Kim was from the Andong Kim clan, which was under the leadership of her father Kim Jo-sun, who was also a member of the Noron faction and who served as Jeongjo of Joseon's closest aide, Lady Kim emerged as a powerful soon-to-be queen when she was selected among the young girls.

Queen consort 
In 1802 at the age of 13, Lady Kim married King Sunjo and became the Queen of Joseon. The Queen eventually bore 5 children; Hyomyeong in 1809, Princess Myeongon in 1810, Princess Bokon in 1818, and Princess Deokon in 1828—with only one son dying in infancy in 1820.

Regent 
When her husband died in 1834, she became regent for her eight-year-old grandson, King Heonjong and the political power remained in the hands of her family, the Andong Kim clan until 1840, when it passed to the family of Heonjong's mother, Queen Sinjeong, the Pungyang Jo clan, following the Catholic persecution of 1839.

Prior to the death of her grandson in 1849 and becoming regent once again, the Queen had outlived her children as one of her remaining daughters, Princess Deokon, died in 1844. The Queen eventually became regent again during King Cheoljong’s reign in 1849. With her influence, she had the king marry a daughter from her clan in 1851, who was known as Queen Cheorin, and ruled as regent until his fourth year of reign in 1852.

Death 
Queen Sunwon later died in Changdeok Palace, on 21 September 1857. The Queen's clan power later diminished when Queen Shinjeong adopted Grand Internal Prince Heungseon’s son, Yi Myeong-bok, as her own to become the next king. The Queen Dowager stepped down and gave all power to the Grand Internal Prince Heungseon to help his son as regent; thus removing all power of the Andong Kim clan’s influence as well as the Pungyang Jo clan in the end.

Queen Sunwon is buried with her husband in Inreung located in Naegok-dong, Seocho District, Seoul.

Family 
 Great-Great-Great-Great-Great-Great-Great-Great-Grandfather
 Kim Saeng-hae (김생해, 金生海)
 Great-Great-Great-Great-Great-Great-Great-Grandfather
 Kim Geuk-hyo (김극효, 金克孝) (16 September 1542 - 3 February 1618)
 Great-Great-Great-Great-Great-Great-Great-Grandmother
 Jeong Mal-jeong (정말정, 鄭末貞), Lady Jeong of the Dongrae Jeong clan (동래 정씨) (1542 - ?)
 Great-Great-Great-Great-Great-Great-Grandfather
 Kim Sang-gwan (김상관, 金尙觀)
 Great-Great-Great-Great-Great-Grandfather
 Kim Gwang-chan (김광찬, 金光燦) (1597 - 24 February 1668)
 Great-Great-Great-Great-Great-Grandmother
 Lady Kim of the Yeonan Kim clan (본관: 연안 김씨)
 Great-Great-Great-Great-Grandfather
 Kim Su-hang (김수항, 金壽恒) (1629 - 9 April 1689)
 Great-Great-Great-Great-Grandmother
 Lady Na of the Anjeong Na clan (본관: 안정 나씨)
 Great-Great-Great-Grandfather
 Kim Chang-jib (김창집, 金昌集) (1648 - 2 May 1722)
 Great-Great-Great-Grandmother
 Lady Park (박씨)
 Great-Great-Grandfather
 Kim Je-gyeom (김제겸, 金濟謙)
 Great-Grandfather
 Kim Dal-haeng (김달행, 金達行)
 Grandfather
 Kim Yi-jong (김이중, 金履中); served as Prime Minister
 Grandmother
 Lady Shin of the Pyeongsan Shin clan (본관: 평산 신씨, 平山 申氏)
 Father
 Kim Jo-sun (김조순, 金祖淳) (1765–1832)
 Mother
 Internal Princess Consort Cheongyang of the Cheongsong Sim clan (청양부부인 심씨, 靑陽府夫人 沈氏) (1766 - 1828)
 Grandfather: Sim Geon-ji (심건지, 沈健之)
 Grandmother: Lady Yi of the Jeonju Yi clan (증 정경부인 전주 이씨); Sim Geon-ji's second wife
 Step-grandmother: Lady Song of the Eunjin Song clan (증 정경부인 은진 송씨)
 Siblings
 Older brother: Kim Yu-geun (김유근, 金逌根) (March 1785 - July 1840); became the adopted son of Kim Yong-sun (김용순, 金龍淳) and Lady Hong of the Pungsan Hong clan (정경부인 풍산 홍씨, 貞敬夫人 豊山 洪氏)
 Older brother: Kim Won-geun (김원근, 金元根) (1786 - 1832)
 Younger brother: Kim Jwa-geun (김좌근, 金左根) (1797–1869)
 Sister-in-law: Lady Yun (윤씨, 尹氏)
 Adoptive nephew: Kim Byeong-gi (김병기, 金炳冀) (1818 - 1875)
 Adoptive niece-in-law: Lady Nam (남씨, 南氏); Nam Gu-sun's daughter
 Adoptive grand-nephew: Kim Yong-gyun (김용균, 金用均)
 Younger sister: Lady Kim of the Andong Kim clan
 Brother-in-law: Nam Gu-sun (남구순, 南久淳)
 Nephew: Nam Byeong-cheol (남병철, 南秉哲) (1817 - 1863)
 Niece: Lady Nam (남씨, 南氏)
 Younger sister: Lady Kim of the Andong Kim clan
 Brother-in-law: Yi Gyeom-jae (이겸재, 李謙在)
 Younger sister: Lady Kim of the Andong Kim clan
 Brother-in-law: Yi Geung-woo (이긍우, 李肯愚)
 Younger brother: Kim Son-geun (김손근, 金遜根)
 Husband
 Yi Gong, King Sunjo (조선 순조) (29 July 1790 – 13 December 1834)
 Father-in-law: Yi San, King Jeongjo (조선 정조) (28 October 1752 – 18 August 1800)
 Mother-in-law: Royal Noble Consort Su of the Bannam Park clan (수빈 박씨) (1 June 1770 – 6 February 1823)
 Legal mother-in-law: Queen Hyoui of the Cheongpung Kim clan (효의왕후 김씨) (5 January 1754 – 10 April 1821)
 Issue
 Son: Crown Prince Hyomyeong (효명세자) (18 September 1809 – 25 June 1830)
 Daughter-in-law: Crown Princess Jo of the Pungyang Jo clan (신정익황후 조씨) (21 January 1809 – 4 June 1890)
 Grandson: King Heonjong of Joseon (헌종) (8 September 1827 – 25 July 1849)
 Granddaughter-in-law: Queen Hyohyeon of the Andong Kim clan (효현왕후 김씨) (27 April 1828 – 18 October 1843)
 Granddaughter-in-law: Queen Hyojeong of the Namyang Hong clan (효정왕후 홍씨) (6 March 1831 – 2 January 1904)
 Adoptive grandson: Yi Hui, Emperor Gojong of Korea (8 September 1852 – 21 January 1919) (광무태황제)
 Adoptive granddaughter-in-law: Min Ja-yeong, Empress Myeongseong of the Yeoheung Min clan (17 November 1851 – 8 October 1895) (명성태황후 민씨)
 Daughter: Princess Myeongon (명온공주) (1810–1832)
 Son-in-law: Kim Hyeon-geun (김현근, 金賢根) of the Andong Kim clan (1810 - 1868)
 Granddaughter: Lady Kim of the Andong Kim clan (김씨, 金氏); died prematurely 
 Unnamed grandchild; died prematurely
 Adoptive grandson: Kim Byeong-chan (김병찬, 金炳瓚)
 Daughter: Princess Bokon (복온공주) (1818–1832)
 Son-in-law: Kim Byeong-ju (김병주, 金炳疇) of the Andong Kim clan (1819 - 1853)
 Unnamed son (1820 - 1820)
 Daughter: Princess Deokon (덕온공주) (1822–1844)
 Son-in-law: Yun Ui-seon (윤의선, 尹宜善) (? - 1887)
 Adoptive grandson: Yun Yong-gu (윤용구, 尹用求)
 Adoptive son: King Cheoljong of Joseon (철종대왕) (25 July 1831 – 16 January 1864)
 Adoptive daughter-in-law: Queen Cheorin of the Andong Kim clan (철인왕후 김씨) (27 April 1837 – 12 June 1878)
 Adoptive grandson: Prince Royal Yi Yung-jun (원자 이융준) (22 November 1858 – 25 May 1859)

In popular culture
 Portrayed by Han Soo-yeon in the 2016 KBS2 TV series Moonlight Drawn by Clouds.
 Portrayed by Bae Jong-ok in the 2020–2021 tvN TV series Mr. Queen.

References

External links 
 http://www.guide2womenleaders.com/korea_heads.htm

19th-century Korean people
1789 births
19th-century women rulers
1857 deaths
Regents of Korea
Andong Kim clan
Royal consorts of the Joseon dynasty
Korean queens consort
19th-century Korean women
Korean posthumous empresses